Lady Jesus is the debut studio album recorded by American singer-songwriter Upsahl, released on October 8, 2021 by Arista Records. Four singles from the album, "Douchebag", "Lunatic", "Melatonin" and "Time of My Life", were released prior to the album's release, accompanied with official music videos. The album discusses and expresses anger and revenge against Upsahl's claimed ex-partner, who allegedly cheated on her and caused more drama after the incident.

Composition 
Upsahl found inspiration for the majority of the song's lyrics, which she all took a part in contributing herself from a dramatic break-up she faced, after figuring out that her ex-partner was privately having an affair with another woman. She teamed up with record producers Dwilly, Jonny Shorr, Kill Dave and Pete Nappi to produce 10 tracks for the album in total, which they found inspiration from musical genres like funk and punk. Most of the added songs were written during the COVID-19 pandemic in 2020.

The album explores and experiments with genres such as alternative pop, indie pop and pop rock, and uses elements of hip hop, electropop and R&B. The track "Sunny D" features vocals of Elijah Noll.

Track listing

References

2021 debut albums
Arista Records albums